Udo Dziersk (born Gelsenkirchen, 1961) is a contemporary German painter.

Since 2002 Udo Dziersk has been professor of the Orientierungs-Bereich at the Kunstakademie Düsseldorf, mentoring newcomers of the student body before they assume their direction by joining a class. He was a student at the academy under Gerhard Richter and later Markus Lüpertz from 1983 to 1988 and did studies aside with Per Kirkeby and Georg Baselitz. His works are often inspired by the experiences and impressions of his extensive travels around the world, though as cultural stimulus for what develops from sketches to canvas.

See also
 List of German painters

References

External links 
 Works 

1961 births
Living people
20th-century German painters
20th-century German male artists
German male painters
21st-century German painters
21st-century German male artists
Kunstakademie Düsseldorf alumni
Academic staff of Kunstakademie Düsseldorf